Asgarabad-e Abbasi (also Romanized as ‘Asgarābād-e ‘Abbāsī; also known as ‘Asgarābād) is a village in Asgariyeh Rural District, in the Central District of Pishva County, Tehran Province, Iran. At the 2006 census, its population was 1,024, in 268 families.

References 

Populated places in Pishva County